Croxdale Hall is a privately owned country mansion situated at Croxdale near Sunderland Bridge, County Durham. It is a Grade I listed building.

Ownership 
The staunchly Roman Catholic Salvin family came to Croxdale by the marriage in 1402 of Gerard Salvin of Harswell, Yorkshire, to Agnes de Rissaby, heiress of Croxdale. They have held the property ever since. Records of the Salvin family are held by Durham County Record Office.

History of the house 
The house originally in Tudor style dates from the 17th century but major alterations in about 1760 were carried out probably to designs by architect John Carr, including the two storey seven bay west entrance front. The impressive internal Rococo plasterwork dates from this time.

A three-walled garden and lakes were laid out in the mid-18th century, creating a pleasure ground through which the family could demonstrate their wealth and status with the exotic plants they acquired through their gardener John Kennedy (1719–90) and his Hammersmith based nurseryman brother Lewis Kennedy (1721–82) and his business partner James Lee (1715–95). Historic England have raised concerns about the conditions of the gardens.

Further alterations to the house by architect James Wyatt in about 1807 included the addition of a five bay south wing and the insertion of a Gothic Revival-style Roman Catholic chapel into the 18th century north wing.

A disused 12th-century chapel which stands in the grounds is a Scheduled Ancient Monument and also a Grade I listed building. It was in use as a Chapel of Ease to St Oswalds, Elvet, until the new parish church of St. Bartholomew was built by the Salvins in 1845. The chapel is on English Heritage's Buildings At Risk register and is deemed to be in poor condition, particularly due to severe damp. Also in the grounds is an 18th-century house (Grade II* listed) which housed the priests who served as Chaplains to the Salvin family.

Twentieth and Twenty First Century 
The house served as a military hospital 1940-1945 and thereafter as a maternity home until at least 1954. More recently the hall has been restored as a family home.

The house is open the public only by appointment (see the Visit North East England reference for details).

References

External links
 
  Architectural description of listed building.
   Keys to the Past
     History of the County of Durham (1928) Vol 3 pp157-174 from British History on Line
  Visit North East England entry on Croxdale Hall

Country houses in County Durham
Grade I listed buildings in County Durham